A market square (also known as a market place) is a square meant for trading, in which a market is held. It is an important feature of many towns and cities around the world. A market square is an open area where market stalls are traditionally set out for trading, commonly on one particular day of the week known as market day.

A typical English market square consists of a square or rectangular area, or sometimes just a widening of the main street. It is usually in the centre of the town, surrounded by major buildings such as the parish church, town hall, important shops and hotels, and the post office, together with smaller shops and business premises. There is sometimes a permanent covered market building or a cloth hall, and the entire area is a traditional meeting place for local people as well as a centre for trade.

See also 

 List of city squares
 List of city squares by size
 Marketplace
 Markt
 Piazza
 Plateia
 Plaza

References 

Town squares
Retail markets